The Iron Guard (abbreviated as GH) was an Argentinian political organisation with its headquarters in Buenos Aires. It followed the political movement of Peronism. It was founded in 1962 by Alejandro "Gallego" Álvarez and Héctor Tristán, both members of the Peronist resistance. These two were against the policies of Augusto Vandor and the dictatorship of Juan Carlos Onganía. Left-wing members like Roberto Grabois, a socialist, would later join the Iron Guard. Other notable members were Amelia Podetti (a philosopher and writer), Julio Bárbaro (a politician) and Roberto Roitman (an economist). The Iron Guard was related to the Student National Front (FEN).

After the death of Juan Perón, the group was dissolved, although a "sector" led by Álvarez continued its political activities. This sector allied with Isabel Perón in 1975 to avoid a possible coup.

See also
 Iron Guard, the Romanian movement and party of the same name

References

Peronism
Political organisations based in Argentina
Political parties established in 1962
Political parties disestablished in 1974